The transforming growth factor beta (TGF-β) superfamily is a large group of structurally related cell regulatory proteins that was named after its first member, TGF-β1, originally described in 1983. They interact with TGF-beta receptors.

Many proteins have since been described as members of the TGF-β superfamily in a variety of species, including invertebrates as well as vertebrates and categorized into 23 distinct gene types that fall into four major subfamilies:

 The TGF-β subfamily 
 The bone morphogenetic proteins and the growth differentiation factors
 The activin and inhibin subfamilies
 The left-right determination factors
 A group encompassing various divergent members

Transforming growth factor-beta (TGF-beta) is a multifunctional peptide that controls proliferation, differentiation and other functions in many cell types. TGF-beta-1 is a peptide of 112 amino acid residues derived by proteolytic cleavage from the C-terminal of a precursor protein. These proteins interact with a conserved family of cell surface serine/threonine-specific protein kinase receptors, and generate intracellular signals using a conserved family of proteins called SMADs.  They play fundamental roles in the regulation of basic biological processes such as growth, development, tissue homeostasis and regulation of the immune system.

Structure
Proteins from the TGF-beta superfamily are only active as homo- or heterodimer; the two chains being linked by a single disulfide bond. From X-ray studies of TGF-beta-2, it is known that all the other cysteines are involved in intrachain disulfide bonds. As shown in the following schematic representation, there are four disulfide bonds in the TGF-beta's and in inhibin beta chains, while the other members of this superfamily lack the first bond.

                                                      interchain
                                                      |
           +------------------------------------------|+
           |                                          ||
 
     |      |                  |  |                                        | |
     +------+                  +--|----------------------------------------+ |
                                  +------------------------------------------+

where 'C' denotes a conserved cysteine involved in a disulfide bond.

Examples 
Human genes encoding proteins that contain this domain include:

AMH;       ARTN;      BMP2;      BMP3;      BMP4;      BMP5; BMP6;      BMP7;      BMP8A;     BMP8B;     BMP10;     BMP15;     
GDF1; GDF2;      GDF3;     GDF5;      GDF6;      GDF7;      GDF9;       GDF10;     GDF11;     GDF15; GDNF;      INHA;      INHBA;     INHBB;     INHBC;     INHBE;     LEFTY1;    LEFTY2;
MSTN;      NODAL;     NRTN;      PSPN;      TGFB1; TGFB2;     TGFB3;

References

Developmental genes and proteins
TGFβ domain
Protein domains
Membrane proteins
Protein superfamilies